Miguel Antonio Murillo Rivas (born July 3, 1988 in Bogotá) is a Colombian footballer currently playing as a striker.

Career
Murillo began his professional career playing with Uruguayan side Juventud Las Piedras in 2006. He spent the next two years playing in the Second Division, til mid-2007, when his team returned to the First División. He scored his first goal in Uruguay's top-flight football league on May 4, 2008 in a 1–1 away draw against Montevideo Wanderers.

In August 2010, he signed a new deal with El Tanque Sisley.

External links
 Profile at BDFA
 Profile at soccerway

1988 births
Living people
Colombian footballers
Colombian expatriate footballers
Association football forwards
Juventud de Las Piedras players
El Tanque Sisley players
Audax Italiano footballers
Chilean Primera División players
Expatriate footballers in Chile
Expatriate footballers in Uruguay
Footballers from Bogotá